Samuel Ampzing (24 June 1590 – 29 July 1632) was a Dutch minister, poet and purist.

Biography
Born to the minister Johannes Ampzing in Haarlem, in 1616 Samuel became a minister himself at Rijsoord in Strevelshoek, and in 1619 at the Sint-Bavokerk in Haarlem.

Description and praise of Haarlem
In 1617, he began writing a description of Haarlem in poetic form, aided by Petrus Scriverius. Its poetry was printed and published in 1628. This history of the city was not superseded until Pieter Langendijk's nearly a century later. As a foreword to this book, Ampzing wrote a dissertation on the Dutch language, in which he also wrote about the rules of rhetoric; this foreword was also sold separately in 1628 under the title ""Taelbericht der Nederlandsche spellinge" ("Treatise on Dutch spelling"). Later, he also wrote an extra "Laurel Wreath to Laurens Janszoon Koster" at the end of it. The book includes some plates by Willem Outgertsz Akersloot after designs by Pieter Saenredam and Jan van de Velde:

Legacy
Apart from the historical importance of his writing, his poetry was not considered quite lyrical, but it was striking in its groomed linguistic usage.  Ampzing was notably and carefully different from his contemporaries in his choice of words, and fervently opposed to using words from different languages, such as Latin and French, in Dutch texts.  He considered the influence of these languages as pernicious, and as polluting the pure Dutch language.  One suspects that he was also driven to this point of view since these languages were being used by his 'religious competitors'.

Ampzing's lingual struggle was reignited in 1999 by the foundation of the Ampzing Society, whose members fight - like Ampzing - against the superfluous use of English loan-words in the contemporary Dutch language.  On 26 November 2006, on the Oude Groenmarkt at Haarlem, they unveiled a bust of Ampzing.

Works
Bijbel-poezije (1624) - the Bible translated into poetry 
Rijm-catechismus (1624)  - the catechism translated into poetry 
Beschrijvinge ende lof der stad Haerlem in Holland: in Rym bearbeyd (1628) - Description and praise of the city Haarlem in Holland in poetry, available in Google books.
Taelbericht der Nederlandsche spellinge (1628) 
Eerverdediginge tegen de Arminiaensche grimmigheijd (1629) - Apologia against the Arminian heretics 
Naszousche lauren-kranze (1629) - laurel wreath
Westindische triumphbazuin op de verovering van de zilveren vloot (1629) - west Indies triumphal ode on the defeat of the silver fleet

External links
Ampzing Society
Samuel Ampzing in the DBNL

Reformed Churches Christians from the Netherlands
Linguists from the Netherlands
Dutch Golden Age writers
17th-century Dutch historians
1590 births
1632 deaths
Writers from Haarlem
Frans Hals